Untamed Heart is a 1993 American romantic drama film directed by Tony Bill, written by Tom Sierchio, and starring Christian Slater and Marisa Tomei. It tells the story of an unlikely romance between a young woman unlucky in love and a shy young man who has a heart defect. The original music score was composed by Cliff Eidelman, and includes a classical arrangement of "Nature Boy".  A remixed version of Suzanne Vega's 1987 song "Tom's Diner" is featured in the opening scene of the film.

Plot
Caroline is a young woman living in Minneapolis. She is a beauty school student and a part-time waitress at a diner. She works with her best friend, Cindy, and Adam, a busboy and dishwasher who keeps to himself. One night at work, after Caroline's latest boyfriend breaks up with her, she and Cindy find themselves talking about Adam. Cindy confides that she thinks Adam is "kinda cute" and adds, "I'd do him if he wasn't so dumb".

Walking home from work one night, Caroline is accosted by two men who attempt to rape her, but Adam shows up and fights them off. Unbeknownst to Caroline, Adam had been following her from a distance every night to make sure she gets home safely. The next evening at work, Caroline thanks Adam for coming to her rescue, and he quietly begins to open up about himself to her, bringing the two closer. Caroline later confides in Cindy that she was almost raped and that Adam saved her life, and thus she is now interested in Adam, which Cindy supports.

Things begin looking up for Caroline as she and Adam become a couple: Caroline buys a used car, and Adam is beginning to overcome his shyness. One night the same two men who tried to rape Caroline attack and stab Adam outside the diner. Adam is rushed to the hospital, and Caroline later identifies the perpetrators in a police lineup. While Adam is recovering, Caroline learns that he has a heart defect and will die without a transplant. Adam, claiming that he has a baboon's heart (lovingly told to him by a nun at the orphanage where he grew up), refuses to listen, stating that he is afraid he will no longer be the same person if he gets a transplant. Caroline tries to assure Adam that love comes from a person's mind and soul, but she is deeply touched when Adam asks why it hurts so much "here" (pointing to his own heart) when one's heart is broken.

On his birthday, Caroline visits Adam at his apartment and surprises him by taking him to a Minnesota North Stars hockey game, but Adam surprises her with flowers and a gift that he left for her to be opened only after they return. At the game, Adam catches a stray hockey puck, and on the way home Adam falls asleep next to Caroline, but when they reach his house she discovers to her horror that his heart has given out and he had died in his sleep.

After Adam's funeral, Caroline goes to his apartment and opens his gift for her: a box of his record albums with a handwritten note declaring his love.

Cast
 Marisa Tomei as Caroline
 Christian Slater as Adam
 Rosie Perez as Cindy
 Kyle Secor as Howard
 Willie Garson as Patsy
 Claudia Wilkens as Mother Camilla 
 James Cada aa Bill #1
 Gary Groomes as Bill #2
 Charley Bartlett as young Adam
 Vincent Kartheiser as orphan boy
 John Beasley as cook
 Steve Cochran as Stromboli 
 Tom Sierchio as Ronnie

Production

Development 
Tony Bill discovered Tom Sierchio's screenplay for Untamed Heart during one of his talent searches: he had asked an agent at William Morris to send him screenplays from new writers. Originally, Sierchio's screenplay had been submitted as a writer's sample. Bill showed the screenplay to producer Helen Bartlett who suggested that they option it. Within two weeks of Sierchio handing his script to his agent, MGM had greenlighted the project. The film was originally titled The Baboon Heart in honor of an infant named Baby Fae who received a cross-species heart transplant from a baboon to fix a congenital heart defect.

Casting 
Initially, Bill had not considered Christian Slater for the role of Adam, but he eventually became “the obvious choice” for the director. For the role of Caroline, Bill remembered Marisa Tomei auditioning for his earlier  film, 1987's Five Corners. Tomei's newfound success with My Cousin Vinny helped in her casting.

Filming 
Sierchio's screenplay was originally set in New Jersey, but for logistical reasons they could not shoot there. The filmmakers considered finding a location to double for the state, but while Bill, Bartlett, and Sierchio were scouting in Minneapolis, they realized it was an ideal location because of its strong acting community (they cast 35 of the film's 40 roles from it) and a large commercial production community that allowed them to utilize a mostly local crew.

The city's locations were also a strong factor in deciding to shoot there. The centerpiece was Jim's Coffee Shop & Bakery, which actually existed at the time of production but was closed to the public for the duration of shooting the film. Bill said, "It had a wonderful combination of ingredients from every diner you've ever been to; we've done very little to change it for the film. In fact, we changed the original name of the diner in the script to reflect that it is Jim's."

Principal photography began in March 1992 amidst cold temperatures. Because several winter scenes were shot in May, fake snow was used to give the appearance of winter weather. One scene was shot at the Met Center, the home of the then-Minnesota North Stars (now the Dallas Stars) at the time. Tomei wanted to have a believable regional accent and had her driver Craig Kittelson double act as her dialogue coach.

Reception

Critical reception 
Untamed Heart received mixed reviews and has a 58% rating on Rotten Tomatoes based on 26 reviews.  On Metacritic, the film has a 59 out of 100 from 26 critics.

In a three-star review, film critic Roger Ebert wrote that the film was "kind of sweet and kind of goofy, and works because its heart is in the right place.” Hal Hinson of The Washington Post said that the film "is hopelessly syrupy, preposterous and more than a little bit lame, but, still, somehow it got to me". Vincent Canby of The New York Times said the film "is to the mind what freshly discarded chewing gum is to the sole of a shoe: an irritant that slows movement without any real danger of stopping it".

Many critics opined that the actors saved the film from overwrought sentimentality, leaden dialogue and implausible plotting. Much of the praise in particular went to Marisa Tomei's performance. Owen Gleiberman of Entertainment Weekly gave the film a "B−" rating and wrote, "if Untamed Heart is often too precious for words, there’s one thing in it that feels miraculously fresh…Marisa Tomei, who follows up her rollicking caricature of a streetwise Italian dish in My Cousin Vinny by proving that she’s a major actress…rescues her role through sheer eagerness. She gazes at Slater with such ardor and delight that he’s transformed, and so is the audience.”

Peter Rainer of the Los Angeles Times said Tomei “pulls you into Caroline’s spunky despair without ever condescending to the character.” In his review for The New Yorker, Anthony Lane praised Tomei for bringing "startling high spirits to a dullish role. She snatches moments of happiness out of the air and shares them out to anyone who's around.” Hinson added, “when Slater and Tomei are alone together, their exchanges are so shyly affectionate, so sweet, that they soften the hardest hearts.”

Of Slater, Rainer said he “does an impressive job of burying most of his Christian Slater-isms. Gone are the wily Jack Nicholson-ish line readings and smart-aleck scruffiness”, while Ebert wrote he “projects the right note of mystery and doomed romance.” Rolling Stone magazine's Peter Travers wrote, "The Rain Man-Dying Young elements in Tom Sierchio's script are pitfalls that Slater dodges with a wonderfully appealing performance.”

Mike Clark, in his review for USA Today, wrote, "Director Tony Bill (My Bodyguard) is adept both in the yarn's meticulous buildup and in his handling of the actors". Travers concluded “it's Tomei and [Rosie] Perez who give Untamed Heart its buoyant wit. Their friendship could have sustained an entire movie.”

Box office 
The film grossed $19 million in the United States and Canada and $5 million overseas for a worldwide total of $24 million.

Home media
Untamed Heart was originally released on VHS on May 22, 1993. It was released on DVD by MGM Home Entertainment on June 9, 2001. It was released on Blu-ray by Kino Lorber on March 5, 2019.

References

External links

 
 
 
 
 

1993 films
1993 romantic drama films
American romantic drama films
Films set in Minnesota
Films shot in Minnesota
Metro-Goldwyn-Mayer films
Films scored by Cliff Eidelman
Films directed by Tony Bill
1990s English-language films
1990s American films